Jessica Willey is a general assignment reporter for KTRK Channel 13 news in Houston. Prior to KTRK, Willey was a reporter for KOKH-TV in Oklahoma City. She received a Bachelor of Science in Broadcast Journalism and a Bachelor of Arts in International Relations from what is now the Pardee School of Global Studies at  Boston University.

In 2006, Willey was awarded a regional Emmy for a program about the controversial German-based Body Worlds exhibition that displays plastinated human bodies and human body parts in museums around the world.

External links
 ABC 13 Biography page

Year of birth missing (living people)
Living people
Boston University College of Arts and Sciences alumni
American television journalists
American women television journalists
Television anchors from Houston
Boston University College of Communication alumni
21st-century American women